Bilobodera is a genus of nematodes belonging to the family Rotylenchulidae.

Species:

Bilobodera flexa 
Bilobodera mesoangustus

References

Nematodes